Chad Ferrin is an American horror film director, screenwriter, producer and actor.

Biography
Ferrin first broke into the film industry as a production assistant on films such as Halloween: The Curse of Michael Myers and Hellraiser: Bloodline. He moved on to directing episodes of the Troma television series Troma's Edge TV.

Unspeakable marked Ferrin's writing and feature directing debut. The film, shot for $20,000, was released by Troma.

Ferrin next wrote, produced and directed The Ghouls. Called "a no-budget horror opus" the film was shot on Mini DV for $15,000.

After The Ghouls, Ferrin directed one segment of the Troma film Tales from the Crapper in 2004. This direct-to-DVD film starred Lloyd Kaufman, James Gunn, Julie Strain and Ron Jeremy.

Ferrin's film Easter Bunny, Kill! Kill!  has become a cult classic with horror fans worldwide. The DVD for Chad's film Someone's Knocking at the Door was released on 25 May 2010. Both of Ferrin's films Someone's Knocking at the Door and Easter Bunny Kill! Kill! are part of the Dark Delicacies collection 2010. Chad is set to direct the horror/thriller Dances With Werewolves in 3-D. Ferrin narrated his film Someone's Knocking at the Door upon its re-release on 24 July 2010 at the Sci-Fi Center in Sin City. Chad is the director of the upcoming 2016 horror film The Chair, based on the graphic novel from Alterna Comics, and starring Naomi Grossman. Chad is also set to direct, produce the forthcoming western thriller Horse.

Partial filmography

Actor

The Ghouls (2003) – Father
aka Cannibal Dead: The Ghouls (UK: video title)
Troma's Edge TV (2000) – Chad Ferrin
Unspeakable (2000) – Joey

Writer
 Parasites (2016)
Someone's Knocking at the Door (2011)
Easter Bunny, Kill! Kill! (2006)
The Ghouls (2003)
aka Cannibal Dead: The Ghouls (UK: video title)
Unspeakable (2000)

Director
Pig Killer (2022)
The Deep Ones (2020)
Exorcism at 60,000 Feet (2020)
Horse (2017)
Parasites (2016)
The Chair (2016)
Someone's Knocking at the Door (2011)
Easter Bunny, Kill! Kill! (2006)
Tales from the Crapper (2004)
The Ghouls (2003)
Unspeakable (2000)

References

External links

[Official website at The Chair

American male film actors
American film directors
American male screenwriters
Living people
Year of birth missing (living people)